The UEMOA Tournament is a football (soccer) tournament held between nations who are a member of the West African Economic and Monetary Union (UEMOA). The tournament was first played in 2007. It is also called Coupe de l'intégration ouest africaine.

The teams are made up of players in national leagues of the organisation's member countries, in an effort to promote local talents.

Participating nations
The participating nations are:

Past winners
The 2014 edition was cancelled because of an ebola outbreak. The next edition then was only played in 2016.

References

External links
 Official Site

  
International association football competitions in West Africa